Harold Wren may refer to:

Harold Finch (Person of Interest), fictional character whose earliest alias was Harold Wren
Harold G. Wren, founder of Environmental Law